Ranch to Market Road 1623 (RM 1623) is a  farm to market road in Gillespie and Blanco counties, Texas.

Route description
RM 1623 begins in eastern Gillespie County at an intersection with  RM 2721. It travels to the south into Stonewall, where it crosses Ranch Road 1, and has a one-block eastward concurrency with  US 290 before continuing southward. It then turns to the southeast and crosses into Blanco County. The route intersects  RM 1888 before turning to the east and running along the north bank of the Blanco River into Blanco. The RM 1623 designation ends at  US 281 in central Blanco; the roadway continues as  Loop 163.

History
Its length was extended to 10.3 mi in 1953 and increased again in 1954; the designation ended at the Gillespie County line. The extension into Gillespie County and to US 290 would be approved in 1955. The route was redesignated in 1969 as an RM route, the same year the extension to RM 2721 was added.

Major intersections

Notes

References

1623
Transportation in Blanco County, Texas
Transportation in Gillespie County, Texas